Serhiy Olizarenko (born 9 September 1954) is a retired Soviet  steeplechase runner. He competed at the 1980 Summer Olympics, but failed to reach the final.

Olizarenko was born in Kirovohrad Oblast, Ukraine, and in 1968 moved to Odessa. At the 1980 Olympic semi-final he tore an Achilles tendon and had to abandon the race. After that he had two surgeries, but failed to recover and retired from competitions.

In 1978 Olizarenko met the middle-distance runner Nadezhda Mushta. They married the same year, and had a daughter Oksana born soon after the 1980 Olympics.

References

1954 births
Living people
Athletes (track and field) at the 1980 Summer Olympics
Soviet male middle-distance runners
Soviet male steeplechase runners
Olympic athletes of the Soviet Union